Tecnifibre is a French manufacturer of sporting equipment, specializing in tennis and squash. It was founded in 1979 by the current CEO Thierry Maissant. Throughout its development, Tecnifibre has built itself a worldwide reputation in the tennis and squash market, releasing rackets, bags, strings, apparel and other accessories. Lacoste announced on 31 August 2017 acquisition of an 80% stake in the capital of Major Sports and became the owner of Tecnifibre on 1 October.

History
Tecnifibre first became known for its expertise in strings, especially in multifilament, thanks to a unique technology: the "PU400 Inside".  In 2004, Tecnifibre decided to launch its own range of rackets for competitors. Tecnifibre is also very active in squash.

Products

Tennis rackets
T-Fight ISO
T-Fight RS
TF40
TF-X1 (previously T-Flash)
Tempo (previously T-Rebound)

Tennis strings 
[COPOLYESTER]:
Black Code
Black Code 4S
Ice Code
Razor Code
Pro Red Code
Pro Red Code Wax

[MULTIFILAMENT]:
NRG2
X-One Biphase
Multifeel
HDX Tour

[HYBRID]:
Duramix HD
Triax

Squash rackets
Carboflex (125 / 130 / 135 grams)
Suprem (125 / 130 / 135 grams)
Dynergy (125 / 130 / 135 grams)

Sponsorships

Tennis

Men

  Daniil Medvedev
  Nicolau Motilla
  Janko Tipsarević
  Devin Britton
  Denis Istomin
  Aljaž Bedene
  Jérémy Chardy
  Marius Copil
  Filip Peliwo
  John Millman
  Constant Lestienne
  Arthur Rinderknech
  Marc Polmans
  Omar Jasika
  Grégoire Barrère
  Ze Zhang
  Armel Rancezot
  Hiroki Moriya
  Mitchell Krueger
  Nikola Ćirić
  Axel Michon
  Zhe Li
  Dino Marcan
  Maxime Authom
  Daniel Cox
  Robin Olin
  Brian Michael Cernoch
  Henrik Bengtsson
  Jeroen Vanneste
  Sabastian Lavie

Women
  Iga Świątek
  Elise Mertens  
  Mathilde Johansson
  Maryna Zanevska  
  Mai Hontama
  Sachia Vickery
  Elsa Jacquemot

Squash

Men

  Alister Walker
  Miguel Ángel Rodríguez
  Wael El Hindi
  Osama Khalifa
  Mohamed El Shorbagy
  Marwan El Shorbagy
  Thierry Lincou
  Grégoire Marche
  Auguste Dussourd
  Benjamin Aubert
  Enzo Corigliano
  Ramy Ashour 
  Nathan Lake
  Richie Fallows
  Ben Coleman
  Alfredo Ávila
  Farhan Zaman
  Christopher Gordon
  Andrew Douglas

Women

  Nour El Sherbini
  Heba El Torky
  Habiba Mohamed
  Nouran Gohar
  Salma Hany
  Mayar Hany
  Mariam Metwally
 Hania El Hammamy
 Rowan Reda Araby
  Jenny Duncalf 
  Victoria Lust
  Alison Thomson
  Olivia Blatchford
  Dipika Pallikal

Notes

References

External links
 

Tennis equipment manufacturers
Sporting goods manufacturers of France
Companies based in Paris
Manufacturing companies established in 1979
French brands
French companies established in 1979
Sportswear brands
2017 mergers and acquisitions